The year 1928 saw a number of significant events in radio broadcasting history.


Events
1 January – Algemeene Vereeniging Radio Omroep begins broadcasting in the Netherlands.
2 January – The BBC broadcasts The Daily Service – a 15-minute act of Christian worship – for the first time, from its Savoy Hill studios in London. The programme will still be broadcast five mornings a week on BBC Radio 4 (LW) as of 2020.
30 January – First radiotelephone connection between the Netherlands and the United States.
25 March – Italian radio broadcasts its first live football commentary: the game is an international match between Italy and Hungary.  
27 March – KGB (AM) in San Diego begins broadcasting.
2 May – KPQ (AM) in Wenatchee, Washington begins broadcasting.
7 July – The French government issues an order limiting the list of private radio stations permitted to continue broadcasting to: Poste Parisien, Radio Agen, Radio Béziers, Radio Bordeaux Sud-Ouest, Radio Juan-les-Pins, Radio LL, Radio Lyon, Radio Mont-de-Marsan, Radio Montpellier, Radio Nîmes, Radio Paris, Radio Toulouse, and Radio Vitus.
13 September – KOH-AM in Reno, Nevada begins broadcasting.
28 October – Radio Ljubljana begins regularly programmed transmissions.
1 November – The first official broadcast in Romanian is aired by the Societatea de Difuziune Radiotelefonică (Radiotelephonic Broadcasting Company) in Bucharest.
11 November – General Order 40 is implemented by the United States government; this allows the classification of each allocation in the AM band as either "Local," "Regional," or "Clear." This allows for the creation of clear-channel stations broadcasting at maximum power at night.
 KXO (AM) in El Centro, California begins broadcasting.
 WGL (AM) in Fort Wayne, Indiana begins broadcasting.
 WMT (AM) in Cedar Rapids, Iowa begins broadcasting.
 WOL (AM) in Washington, D.C. begins broadcasting.
20 November – WGH (AM) in Newport News, Virginia begins broadcasting.
23 December – NBC sets up its first permanent, coast-to-coast radio network.

Debuts
3 January – The Voice of Firestone (1928–1956), a classical-music program, debuts on NBC.
4 January – The Dodge Victory Hour, a variety show, debuts on NBC.
19 March – Amos 'n' Andy debuts through the NBC Blue Network, broadcasting from WMAQ-AM, a radio station owned by the Chicago Daily News.
November – Live broadcast of National Service of Remembrance in Whitehall, London, first made by the BBC.
19 November – Happy Station Show (1928–1995), hosted by Eddy Startz from 1928 until 1970.
24 December – First broadcast of Festival of Nine Lessons and Carols from King's College Chapel, Cambridge, by the BBC.
Radio calisthenics (ラジオ体操, rajio taisō), daily exercises, first broadcast on NHK in Japan,

Endings
22 April – The Acousticon Hour ends its run on network radio.

Births
16 January – Menchu Álvarez del Valle, Spanish radio journalist (died 2021)
21 May – Tom Donahue, pioneering American rock and roll radio disc jockey and freeform rock pioneer (died 1975)
6 June – R. D. Wingfield, English radio dramatist and detective novelist (died 2007)
19 June – Barry Took, English comedy writer and broadcast presenter (died 2002)
2 July – John Timpson, English radio news presenter (died 2005)
17 August – Willem Duys, Dutch radio/television host (died 2011)
17 September – Brian Matthew, English disc jockey (died 2017)
20 October – Michael O'Donnell, English physician, journalist, medical campaigner and broadcaster (died 2019)
9 November – Wim Bosboom, Dutch radio/television host

References

 
Radio by year